Tabernaemontana ovalifolia is a species of plant in the family Apocynaceae. It is endemic to Jamaica.

References

Flora of Jamaica
ovalifolia
Endangered plants
Endemic flora of Jamaica
Taxonomy articles created by Polbot